Chiclets is an American brand of candy-coated chewing gum manufactured by Mondelez International. The brand was introduced in 1900 by the American Chicle Company, a company founded by Thomas Adams.

History
The Chiclets name is derived from the Mexican Spanish word "chicle", derived from the Aztec Nahuatl word "chictli/tzictli", meaning "sticky stuff" and referring to a pre-Columbian chewing gum found throughout Mesoamerica. This pre-Columbian chewing gum was tapped as a sap from various trees.

Chiclets are essentially the same as the indigenous chicle, with the innovation of a hard sugar coating offered in various flavors and colors. The original flavor was peppermint and assorted fruit flavors were available in Algeria, Argentina, Canada, Colombia, the Dominican Republic, Egypt, India, Iraq, Lebanon, Mexico, Portugal, Syria, Turkey,  the United Kingdom, and parts of the Americas.

Various people have been credited with inventing Chiclets, including the brothers Robert and Frank Fleer and Louis Mahle.

It was mentioned in the Saturday Evening Post in 2019 that as of 2016, Chiclets was discontinued by Mondelez in the United States. It has re-appeared as of 2019, manufactured in Mexico. In 2020 the Trademark Trial and Appeal Board held that the Chiclets trademark had not been abandoned. To further confuse the issue it was noted in an article on the Mashed website that Chiclets, identified as Adams Chiclets, were available at Walmart, Kmart and Amazon in the US. It is unclear whether the product has been changed in its formulation or not.

References

External links

Chewing gum
Cadbury Adams brands
Mondelez International brands
Products introduced in 1900